State Highway 146 (abbreviated SH-146) is a short state highway in Caddo County, Oklahoma. It provides access to Fort Cobb Lake and Fort Cobb State Park. Along the way it passes through Albert. It has no lettered spur routes.

SH-146 was added to the state highway system around 1961. The highway was established with its present-day routing and has always been paved along the entirety of its route.

Route description
State Highway 146 begins at SH-9 north of Fort Cobb. SH-146 heads due north for  before making a sharp turn to the east. SH-146 continues north of Albert for  before reaching Three Way Corner, its junction with SH-152, where it ends.

History
SH-146 first appeared on the 1962 official state map. At this time, the highway followed its present-day route, and its entire length was paved. No changes have been made to the route since 1962.

Junction list

References

External links

SH-146 at OKHighways

Transportation in Caddo County, Oklahoma
146